Palantir may refer to:

 Palantír, a magical sphere in J. R. R. Tolkien's Lord of the Rings
 Palantir Technologies, an American software company